Michele Lamaro (born 3 June 1998) is an Italian professional rugby union player who primarily plays flanker for Benetton of the United Rugby Championship. He has also represented Italy at international level, having made his test debut against France during the Autumn Nations Cup. Lamaro has previously played for clubs such as Primavera, Lazio, and Petrarca in the past.

Gianluca, Lamaro's father, competed for Italy in sailing at the Olympic Games in 1984 and 1988. He was raised ten minutes from Stadio Olimpico and is a native of Rome. Lamaro played for Primavera in his brother's footsteps before gaining a transfer to Lazio and later Petrarca.

Club career 
For 2018–19 Pro14 season, Lamaro was named Permit Player for Benetton in Pro 14.
He was injured on the 9th of February 2019 and took almost a year to recover. In February 2020 he returned to help defeat Cardiff. 

As of the end of the 2022 season, Lamaro is captain of Benetton Rugby.

International career 
From 2016 to 2018, Lamaro was named in the Italy Under 20 squad and from November 2020 he was named in the Italy squad. 

On 25 October 2021, Lamaro was named Captain of Italy squad for 2021 end-of-year rugby union internationals in substitution of Luca Bigi.

in 2022, Lamaro captained Italy to their first win in 36 games in the Six Nations, with a win over Wales in the final round of the 2022 Six Nations Championship.

References

External links 

Michele Lamaro at Benetton Rugby
Michele Lamaro at RugbyPass

1998 births
Living people
Italian rugby union players
Rugby union flankers
S.S. Lazio Rugby 1927 players
Petrarca Rugby players
Benetton Rugby players
Italy international rugby union players